The Rinderberg (2,079 m) is a mountain of the Bernese Alps, located between Gstaad and St. Stephan in the Bernese Oberland. It lies at the northern end of the range that separates the valley of the Saane from the Simmental, north of the Wildhorn.

In winter the Rinderberg is part of the ski area named Gstaad Mountain Rides. A cable car station is located near the top at a height of 2,004 metres.

See also
List of mountains of Switzerland accessible by public transport

References

External links
 Zweisimmen-Rinderberg cable car
 Rinderberg on Hikr

Mountains of the Alps
Two-thousanders of Switzerland
Mountains of the canton of Bern
Cable cars in Switzerland
Mountains of Switzerland